The St. Augustine Alligator Farm Zoological Park is one of Florida's oldest continuously running attractions, having opened on May 20, 1893. It has 24 species of crocodilians, and also a variety of other reptiles, mammals and birds, as well as exhibits, animal performances and educational demonstrations.

History
The park began in 1893 on St. Augustine Beach as a minor attraction at the end of a railway running through neighboring Anastasia Island. The alligators were added at first to get visitors to buy souvenirs and see the museum there. Soon, the reptiles themselves became the main point of interest.

Growing in popularity, the park moved to its current location in the early 1920s. The park changed owners in the 1930s, and, after a devastating fire, they started reconstruction and expansion of the facilities. In 1993, for their 100-year anniversary, the park became the first place in the world to display every species of crocodilian.

In 2008, the zoo opened a new Komodo dragon facility that also exhibits lizards and snakes found within Southeast Asia.

National historic status
On September 10, 1992, the Alligator Farm was designated a U.S. Historic District. As such, it was referred to as the St. Augustine Alligator Farm Historic District.

Collection
As of 2012, this was the only place where one can see every species of alligator, crocodile, caiman and gharial. Over the years, the zoo has expanded to include mammals, birds, and other reptiles.

Crocodilians

American alligator
American crocodile
Black caiman
Broad-snouted caiman
Chinese alligator
Cuban crocodile
Cuvier's dwarf caiman
Desert crocodile
Dwarf crocodile
False gharial
Freshwater crocodile
Gharial
Morelet's crocodile
Mugger crocodile
New Guinea crocodile
Nile crocodile
Orinoco crocodile
Philippine crocodile
Saltwater crocodile
Siamese crocodile
Smooth-fronted caiman
Spectacled caiman
West African slender-snouted crocodile
Yacare caiman

Other reptiles

Alligator snapping turtle
Arrau turtle
Black-headed python
Carpet python
Corn snake
D'Albertis python
Diamondback terrapin
Eastern diamondback rattlesnake
Eastern hognose snake
Florida cottonmouth
Green tree python
Komodo dragon
Lace monitor
New Caledonian giant gecko
Pope's pit viper
Pygmy rattlesnake
Red-tailed green ratsnake
Reticulated python
Timor python
Volcán Darwin giant tortoise
Woma python
Yellow-footed tortoise
Yellow-spotted river turtle

Birds

Black crowned crane
Blue-billed curassow
Cabot's tragopan
Cape vulture
Coscoroba swan
Crested fireback
Curl-crested aracari
Edwards's pheasant
Green-winged macaw
Hooded vulture
Hyacinth macaw
Knobbed hornbill
Marabou stork
Northern pintail
Pesquet's parrot
Plush-crested jay
Red-crested turaco
Ruddy duck
Scarlet macaw
Southern cassowary
Sunbittern
Toco toucan
White-cheeked pintail
White cockatoo
White-crested hornbill
Wood duck
Yellow-headed amazon

Mammals
Goeldi's monkey
Golden lion tamarin
Hoffmann's two-toed sloth
Prehensile-tailed porcupine
Prevost's squirrel
Pygmy marmoset
Red ruffed lemur
Red-rumped agouti
Ring-tailed lemur
White-headed marmoset

Rookery 
The back section of the park contains a large bird rookery, where free-roaming local bird species such as egrets, herons, wood storks and roseate spoonbills nest and rear their young.

Affiliations
The park is a member of the Association of Zoos and Aquariums (AZA) and the Florida Attraction Association.

See also

Alligator farm
Gomek

Notes

External links

Historic districts on the National Register of Historic Places in Florida
National Register of Historic Places in St. Johns County, Florida
Buildings and structures in St. Augustine, Florida
Zoos in Florida
Tourist attractions in St. Augustine, Florida
1893 establishments in Florida